On Christmas Eve 1996, a Learjet 35A business jet disappeared  near Dorchester, New Hampshire, United States. The crash led to the longest missing aircraft search in the state's history, lasting almost three years. Media attention eventually resulted in congressional legislation mandating improved emergency locator transmitters (ELTs) be installed in U.S.-registered business jets.

Crash information 
The aircraft involved, registration N388LS, was operated by the Aircraft Charter Group and flown by pilots Johan Schwartz and Patrick Hayes for a repositioning flight to Lebanon, New Hampshire. They left Sikorsky Memorial Airport in Bridgeport, Connecticut at 09:19 am, and 25 minutes later were flying the approach into Lebanon Municipal Airport. After one attempt at the instrument landing system approach, the crew reported that they were unable to receive the localizer, when they were actually several miles off course. They presumed ground equipment failure, and the pilot told the tower that he was executing a missed approach. As the business jet neared the inbound course to the VOR, the captain called out the outer marker. The first officer agreed, and the captain stated that they could descend to 2,300 ft. Shortly thereafter, the first officer stated that he was descending the aircraft to 2,300 ft. Three seconds later, the Learjet impacted trees, then terrain. The wreckage was located at an altitude of 2,300 ft, on rising mountainous terrain, 061° magnetic, 12.5 nautical miles from the VOR. The weather conditions were raining and foggy at the time.

Searches were mounted, unsuccessfully. Debris was spread over a  area in dense forest. The aircraft had descended into the ground  earlier than normal.

The cause of the accident, as determined by the National Transportation Safety Board, was:

ELT regulations 
The crashed aircraft had no ELT on board, as that class of aircraft when used for FAR Part 135 charter operations, was exempt from the federal requirements for this type of beacon. As a result, Congress directed the FAA to require the installation of 406 MHz ELTs in all business jets (replacing the 121.5 MHz units installed in some).

References

External links 
 Crash and search details

New Hampshire
Accidents and incidents involving the Learjet 45 family
Aviation accidents and incidents in New Hampshire
Aviation accidents and incidents involving controlled flight into terrain
Disasters in New Hampshire
Transportation in Grafton County, New Hampshire
Learjet aircraft
1996 in New Hampshire
Aviation accidents and incidents in the United States in 1996
December 1996 events in the United States